Alexander Abraham may refer to:

 Alexander Abraham (decathlete) (1886–1971)
 Alexander Abraham (boxer) (born 1981)
 Alex Abraham, composer on RWBY
'Quarantine at Alexander Abraham's' in Chronicles of Avonlea